Equipoise is a solo album by keyboardist Stanley Cowell recorded in 1978 and first released on the Galaxy label.

Reception

In his review for AllMusic, Scott Yanow states "Cowell has long had an original style within the modern mainstream and his interplay with his notable sidemen on this program always holds one's interest."

Track listing
All compositions by Stanley Cowell except as indicated
 "Equipoise" - 4:48
 "Lady Blue" (Cecil McBee) - 4:18
 "Musa And Maimoun" - 9:11
 "Dr. Jackle" (Jackie McLean) - 3:14
 "November Mood" - 8:34
 "Dave's Chant" - 7:00

Personnel
Stanley Cowell - piano
Cecil McBee - bass
Roy Haynes - drums

References

1979 albums
Stanley Cowell albums
Galaxy Records albums